Wesley W. Carlson  (July 24, 1901 – July 12, 1989) was an American football guard and tackle in the National Football League. Carlson played with the Green Bay Packers during the 1926 NFL season. He played at the collegiate level at the University of Detroit Mercy.

References

Citations

Bibliography

1901 births
1989 deaths
Players of American football from Michigan
Green Bay Packers players
American football offensive guards
University of Detroit Mercy alumni
Detroit Titans football players